Trams in Australasia may refer to:
 Trams in Australia
 Trams in New Zealand

See also
 Tram (disambiguation)